The 2021–22 Coppa Italia (branded as the Coppa Italia Frecciarossa for sponsorship reasons from the second round) was the 75th edition of the national cup in Italian football.

The number of participating teams was reduced from 78 of the previous season to 44 clubs.

Juventus were the defending champions. They were defeated 4–2 by Inter Milan in the final after extra time; it was Inter's eighth Coppa Italia title, and their first since 2011.

Participating teams

Format and seeding
Teams entered the competition at various stages, as follows:
 First phase (one-legged fixtures)
 Preliminary round: four teams from Serie C and 4 Serie B teams started the tournament
 Round of 64: the four winners were joined by 16 Serie B teams and 12 teams from Serie A
 Round of 32: the 16 winners faced each other
 Second phase
 Round of 16 (one-legged): the eight winners were joined by Serie A clubs, seeded 1–8
 Quarter-finals (one-legged): the eight winners faced each other
 Semi-finals (two-legged): the four winners faced each other
 Final (one-legged): the two winners faced each other

Round dates
The schedule of each round was announced on 12 July 2021.

Preliminary round
A total of 8 teams from Serie B and Serie C competed in this round, 4 of which advanced to the first round. Date and time were released on 21 July 2021.

Round of 64
A total of 32 teams (4 winners from the preliminary round, the remaining 16 teams from Serie B and 12 Serie A teams seeded 9–20) competed in this round, 16 of which advanced to the second round.

Round of 32
The 16 winning teams from the first round competed  in the second round, 8 of which advanced to the round of 16.

Bracket

Round of 16
The round of 16 matches were played between the eight winners from the second round and clubs seeded 1–8 in 2020–21 Serie A. 

Lecce were the only Serie B club in this round.

Quarter-finals
The quarter-final matches were played between clubs advancing from the round of 16.

Semi-finals
Semi-finals (a two-legged round) were played between clubs advancing from the quarter-finals.

First leg

Second leg

Final

Top goalscorers

References

Coppa Italia seasons
Coppa Italia
Italy